Dennis Stock (July 24, 1928 – January 11, 2010) was an American journalist and professional photographer.

Life and career
Stock was born in New York City, to Fannie and Fred Stock. His father was Swiss and his mother was English.

Stock served in the United States Army from 1947 to 1951.  Following his discharge, he apprenticed under photographer Gjon Mili.  In 1951, he won a first prize in a Life magazine competition for young photographers. That same year, he became an associate member of the photography agency Magnum. He became a full partner-member in 1954.
 
Stock met the actor James Dean in 1955, a few months before the latter's sudden death. He undertook a series of photos of the actor in Hollywood, Dean's hometown in Indiana, and in New York City. One of his portraits of Dean in New York's Times Square became an iconic image of the young star. The black and white picture shows the actor with a pulled up collar on a long coat and a cigarette in his mouth on a rain-soaked, grey day. It later appeared in numerous galleries and on postcards and posters and became one of the most reproduced photographs of the post-war period.
 
From 1957 until the early 1960s, Stock aimed his lens at jazz musicians, photographing such people as Louis Armstrong, Billie Holiday, Sidney Bechet, Gene Krupa and Duke Ellington or Miles Davis ( see for example, Milestones Cover Photo). With this series of photographs he published the book Jazz Street.  In 1962, he received the first prize at the International Photo Competition in Poland. In 1968, Stock left Magnum to start his own film company, Visual Objectives Inc., and made several documentaries, but he returned to the agency a year later, as vice president for new media and film. In the mid-1970s, he traveled to Japan and the Far East, and also produced numerous features series, such as photographs of contrasting regions, like Hawaii and Alaska. In the 1970s and 1980s he focused on color photography of nature and landscape, and returned to his urban roots in the 1990s focusing on architecture and modernism.

In 2006, Stock married writer Susan Richards. They lived in Woodstock, New York, with their four dogs.

Film portrayals
In 2011, a documentary film Beyond Iconic: Photographer Dennis Stock, narrated by Stock himself was released. It was completed before his death.

Robert Pattinson portrayed him in the biographical drama film Life (2015), about Stock's friendship with James Dean.

Death
Dennis Stock died of colon and liver cancer in Sarasota, Florida.

Awards
 1991, Advertising Photographers of America, USA
 1962, 1st Prize, International Photography Competition, Poland.
 1951, 1st Prize, Life Young Photographers Contest, USA

Publications
 Alaska, USA: Harry N. Abrams, 1978
 The Alternative: Communal Life in New America, UK: Collier-Macmillan, 1970
 America Seen, France: Contrejour, 1980, 
 Brother Sun, USA: Sierra Club Books, 1974
 California: the Golden Coast, with Philip L. Fradkin, USA: Viking Press/Studio Book, 1974, 
 California Trip, USA: Grossman Publishers, 1970, 
 The Circle of Seasons, with Josephine W. Johnson, USA: Viking Press, 1974, 
 Edge of Life: World of the Estuary, USA: Sierra Club Books, 1972
 Flower Show, USA: Rizzoli, 1986; Impressions, fleurs, France: Mengès, 1986
 A Haiku Journey, Japan/USA: Kodansha International, 1974
 The Happy Year, USA: Channel Press, Inc., 1963
 Hawaii New York: Harry N. Abrams, 1988, ; 1991, 
 I Grandi Fotografi : Dennis Stock, Italy: Gruppo Editoriale Fabbri, 1982
 James Dean: Fifty Years Ago  New York: Harry N. Abrams, 2005,  ; France: La Martinière, 2005.
 James Dean Revisited, USA: Viking Press/Penguin Books, 1978, ; USA: Shirmer & Mosel/Chronicle Books, 1987, 
 Jazz Street, USA: Doubleday, 1960
 Jazz Welt, Germany: Verlag Gerd Hatje, 1959
 Living Our Future : Francis of Assisi, USA: Franciscan Herald, 1972
 Made in the U.S.A., Germany/USA: Cantz, 1995, 
 National Parks Centennial Portfolio, USA: Sierra Club Books, 1972, 
 New England Memories, USA: Bulfinch Press, 1989, 
 Plaisir du Jazz, France: La Guilde du Livre, 1959
 Portrait of a Young Man, James Dean, USA: Kadokawa Shoten, 1956
 Provence Memories, USA: New York Graphic Society, ; Bullfinch Press, 1989, ; Provence, France: Le Chêne, 1988
 Saint Francis of Assisi, with Lawrence Cunningham, USA: Harper & Row, 1981, ; Franziskus: Der Mann aus Assisi, Switzerland: Reich    Verlag, 1981
 This Land of Europe, Japan/USA: Kodansha International, 1976, 
 Voyage Poétique à Travers le Japon d'Autrefois, Switzerland: Office du Livre, 1976

References
  Washington Post: Dennis Stock, 81; Magnum photographer shot iconic moments
  LA Times: Dennis Stock dies at 81; friend and photographer of James Dean

External links
 The New York Times "Lens Blog"
 NYT Video of Stock discussing his friendship with Dean
 MAGNUM Photos – Official Website
  Dennis Stock Photograph of James Dean, 1955
 The film "Beyond Iconic - Photographer Dennis Stock" / 2011 / Directed by Hanna Maria Sawka

1928 births
2010 deaths
Photographers from New York City
Deaths from cancer in Florida
Deaths from colorectal cancer
Deaths from liver cancer
American people of Swiss descent
American photographers
Jazz photographers